Euhybus strumaticus is a species of hybotid dance flies in the family Hybotidae.

References

Further reading

External links

 

Hybotidae
Insects described in 1927